The 2013 Toyota Premier Cup featured Buriram United, the winners of the 2012 Thai League Cup against Nagoya Grampus from the 2012 J. League Division 1.

Final 

2013
2013 in Thai football cups
2013 in Japanese football
2013